Shemini is a Hebrew word that means "eighth", and may refer to:

Shemini (parsha), the 26th weekly Torah portion
Shemini Atzeret, a Jewish holiday

Hebrew words and phrases in the Hebrew Bible